The 1877 Virginia gubernatorial election was held on November 6, 1877 to elect the governor of Virginia. The Republicans failed to nominate a candidate in this election, and as a result Democratic nominee and former Confederate congressman Frederick Holliday faced no opposition. This is the only gubernatorial election in Virginia history in which a candidate has run unopposed.

Results

References

1877
Virginia
gubernatorial
November 1877 events